Naji (also Romanized as Najī, Nojī, and Nejey; also known as Najeh, Najjeh, Nejeh-ye Ḩeydar Shāh, Nīj, and Nije) is a village in Zhavarud-e Gharbi Rural District, Kalatrazan District, Sanandaj County, Kurdistan Province, Iran. At the 2006 census, its population was 310, in 70 families. The village is populated by Kurds.

References 

Towns and villages in Sanandaj County
Kurdish settlements in Kurdistan Province